Lamborghini: The Man Behind the Legend is a 2022 American biographical drama film written and directed by Robert Moresco and starring Frank Grillo as Italian entrepreneur Ferruccio Lamborghini. It was released in select theaters in the United States on November 18, 2022, by Lionsgate.

Plot
Lamborghini follows "the long life of the iconic entrepreneur, from the manufacturing of tractors at the start of his career, to creating military vehicles during World War II, and then on to designing and building the Lamborghini cars that ultimately defined his profound legacy."

Cast
 Frank Grillo as Ferruccio Lamborghini
 Gabriel Byrne as Enzo Ferrari
 Mira Sorvino as Annita
 Romano Reggiani as young Ferruccio Lamborghini
 Matteo Leoni as Matteo 
 Hannah van der Westhuysen as Clelia Monti
 Francesca Tizzano as Gabriella
 Francesca De Martini as Evelina Lamborghini 
 Giulio Mezza as Edmondo Lamborghini 
 Giovanni Scotti as Silvio Lamborghini 
 Fortunato Cerlino as Antonio Lamborghini 
 Giorgio Cantarini as Giorgio Lamborghini 
 Eliana Jones as Billie Alland
 Gian Franco Tordi as Radio Reporter
 Giovanni Antonacci as young Tony Renis

Production
On December 29, 2015, it was announced that Ambi Media Group was developing a feature film based on the life of Italian automaker Ferruccio Lamborghini. The company planned to handle worldwide sales rights of the film through their Ambi Distribution arm. On May 11, 2017, it was reported that Michael Radford would direct the film from a script by Robert Moresco based on Tonino Lamborghini's biography about his father entitled Ferruccio Lamborghini. La storia ufficiale. On March 9, 2018, it was announced that Radford had stepped down as director due to scheduling conflicts, and had been replaced by Moresco himself. On May 14, 2018, it was reported that the film would be co-financed and co-produced by TaTaTu, a newly-launched blockchain-based social entertainment platform.

It was also confirmed that Antonio Banderas and Alec Baldwin had been cast as Lamborghini as an adult and Enzo Ferrari, respectively, with Italian actor Romano Reggiani playing young Lamborghini. Principal photography was reportedly set to begin on April 9, 2018, in Rome and Cento, Italy. In September 2021, Frank Grillo announced that he had replaced Banderas in the film. He also noted that Baldwin had dropped out of the film, though his replacement had not yet been announced. Later that month, production began in Rome and Emilia-Romagna, with Gabriel Byrne, Mira Sorvino, Romano Reggiani, Fortunato Cerlino, and Giorgio Cantarini joining the cast. In October 2021, Eliana Jones was announced as a cast member.

Reception
On Rotten Tomatoes, the film holds a rating of 6% based on 16 reviews, with an average of 3.7/10. Mira Sorvino was nominated for Worst Supporting Actress for her performance at the 43rd Golden Raspberry Awards.

References

External links
 

2022 films
2022 biographical drama films
American biographical drama films
Biographical films about businesspeople
Films about automobiles
Films based on biographies
Films directed by Robert Moresco
Films shot in Rome
Lamborghini
Lionsgate films